The Cluj County Prefecture is a building in Cluj-Napoca, Romania, housing the offices of the Cluj County prefect. It is located at 21 Decembrie 1989 Boulevard, nr. 58.

Built in 1910 according to the plans of architect József Huber, the building combines folk art elements with Gothic, Moorish Revival and Secession. Today, the offices and meeting halls are in a more classical style without extravagant touches. Between 1910 and 1940, the building housed the Chamber of Commerce and Industry. During the Communist period, it was the city hall as well as the local Romanian Communist Party headquarters. It has been the prefecture since 1992.

Romania's Culture Ministry classifies the building as a historic monument.

Notes

External links

Historic monuments in Cluj County
Government buildings completed in 1910
Buildings and structures in Cluj-Napoca
Prefecture buildings in Romania
Former seats of local government
City and town halls in Romania